Luna 8 (E-6 or Ye-6 series), also known as Lunik 8,  was a lunar space probe of the Luna program. It was launched in on 3 December 1965 with the objective of achieving a soft landing on the Moon; however, its retrorocket firing occurred too late, and suffered a hard impact on the lunar surface on the Oceanus Procellarum (Ocean of Storms). The mission did complete the experimental testing of its stellar-guidance system and the ground-control of its radio telemetry equipment, its flight trajectory, and its other instrumentation.

This, the eleventh Soviet attempt to achieve a lunar soft landing, nearly succeeded. After a successful midcourse correction on 4 December, this spacecraft headed toward the Moon without any apparent problems. Just before the scheduled firing of its retrorocket, a command was sent to inflate cushioning air bags around the landing probe. However, a plastic mounting bracket apparently pierced one of the two air bags. The resulting ejection of the air put the spacecraft into a spin of about 12 degrees per second. The spacecraft momentarily regained its proper attitude, long enough for a nine-second-long retrorocket firing, but Luna 8 became unstable again. Without a retrorocket burn long enough to reduce its velocity sufficiently for a survivable landing, Luna 8 plummeted to the lunar surface and crashed at 21:51:30 UT on 6 December in the west of Oceanus Procellarum.

Launch date/time: 3 December 1965 at 10:46:14 UTC
On-orbit dry mass:

See also
 List of artificial objects on the Moon

References

External links

 Zarya - Luna programme chronology

Luna 08
Spacecraft launched in 1965
1965 in the Soviet Union
Spacecraft that impacted the Moon
1965 on the Moon